Infurcitinea tauridella is a moth of the family Tineidae. It is found in Bulgaria, Greece, Turkey and the eastern part of European Russia.

References

Moths described in 1968
Meessiinae